That Darn Cat is a 1997 American mystery comedy film directed by Bob Spiers, written by Scott Alexander and Larry Karaszewski, and starring Christina Ricci and Doug E. Doug. It is a remake of the 1965 film That Darn Cat!, which in turn was based on the 1963 book Undercover Cat by Gordon and Mildred Gordon.

Plot
A pair of bumbling kidnappers break into the house of a businessman with the intention of kidnapping his wife and holding her for ransom. Things do not go according to plan when they mistakenly kidnap house maid Lizzie instead.

Patti Randall is a bored and angry teenage girl who is sick of her quiet and boring (yet fictional) town of Edgefield, Massachusetts. She wishes for more adventure and excitement to come to her boring town. Her parents are unhappy at the way Patti acts and dresses. Every night D.C. leaves at 8 and harasses the neighborhood (such as tricking the dog and eating the dog food or playing with a birdcage while a geriatric and senile old lady orders travel packages).

Meanwhile Patti gets her wish when D.C. walks into the kidnappers' hideout during his nightly prowl.  Lizzie gives the cat her watch with "HELL" scribbled on it. She intended to fully write "HELP" on it, but had to nix on finishing and quickly put it on D.C. in such way to avoid being caught when the kidnappers' phone rings near her. Patti sees the watch the next morning and immediately puts it together that the watch was from Lizzie and was meant to say HELP. But nobody believes Patti, causing her to doctor the evidence by turning the last "L" on the watch into a "P". She goes to Boston and pleads her case to Agent Zeke Kelso at the FBI and he believes her.

Zeke's captain allows Zeke and his agents to tail D.C. during his prowl in hopes of being led to the kidnappers and Lizzie. The operation goes nowhere, causing Zeke to be taken off the case. Zeke and Patti continue investigating anyway, which leads to nothing but dead ends and eventually ends with them being arrested. Patti's manipulation of the watch evidence gets exposed shortly thereafter.

As punishment for her actions, Patti is grounded by her mother. She is so distraught that she decides to run away and leave town. Through having met someone at the train station who is leaving for the same reasons as her, and through a personal conversation, she eventually comes to her senses and decides not to board the next train out of town. Patti sees D.C. digging through the town garden on her walk back from the train station. D.C. takes off and Patti chases him. The cat leads her to the kidnappers' hideout, where they find Lizzie bound and gagged with duct tape.

Patti calls Zeke to let him know that she has found Lizzie. But Zeke is still upset with Patti, and does not want to hear it. This causes Patti and D.C. to enter the kidnappers' hideout. Patti attempts to rescue Lizzie, but she fails and in the process Patti & D.C. become victims, as the kidnappers show up and surprise her.

Zeke decides to re-open the case after he gets a call from Patti's parents asking if he has seen her since she went missing. Zeke investigates and follows a trail that leads him to the kidnappers. He finds Lizzie, Patti, and D.C. bound and gagged; Lizzie and Patti tied to chairs with their mouths duct taped, while D.C. sat in a litter box trapped inside a burlap sack with black cloth over his eyes.

Zeke exposes the identities of the kidnappers as the seemingly harmless Ma and Pa of the local candy shop. Ma and Pa kidnapped Lizzie because they partied away all their cash in Monte Carlo and the Riviera, plus they were also bored out of their skulls. Zeke manages to free Patti and D.C. while Ma and Pa escape with Lizzie in their possession. A final chase ensues as Zeke, Patti, and D.C. attempt to catch Ma and Pa and rescue Lizzie. Fortunately Ma and Pa`s car had been sabotaged by Rollo, while it was undergoing repairs at Dusty`s car repair workshop and was unable to do right turns, resulting in Ma and Pa having to do a series of crazy left roundabout journeys around the town. During the chase, Smokey the dog, escapes after the bumper of Ma and Pa`s car breaks down his fence and he runs towards the cat show, which causes all the cats to run out. D.C. joins them and run up the roof tops of each building, D.C. and the cats jump off and land on Ma and Pa's car, causing them to crash, totaling their car.

Ma and Pa are arrested, Lizzie is reunited with the Flints, Patti and D.C. are nominated as heroes. Patti is later reunited with her parents. After everything is back to normal, Dusty and Rollo the two rival car repairmen are now working together, Melvin and Lu end up together. Patti has also become Zeke's partner, D.C. has married the cat he saw in the window earlier, and they have kittens.

Cast

Production
The film was mainly shot in the areas of Edgefield and North Augusta in South Carolina, as well as in Augusta, Georgia. Animal Makers created the animatronic version of the cat. It was filmed using a 35mm camera for both the colored moving and black and white still pictures. 

Buena Vista Home Entertainment distributed the video in most regions, while Abril Vídeo covered Brazil.

Reception

Box office
The film earned $6,424,617 in its opening weekend and in total grossed $18,301,610 domestically.

It was theatrically released in Australia and New Zealand on August 28, 1997.

Critical response
The film currently holds a 13% approval rating on Rotten Tomatoes, based on 15 critics, with an average rating of 4.1/10. Metacritic assigned the film a weighted average score of 36 out of 100 based on 12 critics, indicating "generally unfavorable reviews". Audiences polled by CinemaScore gave the film an average grade of "A-" on an A+ to F scale.

Stephen Holden of the New York Times was not impressed, remarking: "The opening scenes in That Darn Cat suggest that the movie might have found a gently sarcastic attitude in tune with the know-it-all mood of the late 1990s ... Unfortunately, it isn't long before this wised-up tone gives way to a desperate, mindless freneticism that leaves Ms. Ricci mired in her sulk".

Joe Leydon of Variety said: "It's not quite a catastrophe, but the updated remake of "That Darn cat" is a loud and largely charmless trifle". James Berardinelli of Reelviews was a little more lenient, stating '(the film) is a little more quirky than many Disney films, although that trait doesn't make it appreciably more watchable".

In January 1998, it was included on Siskel and Ebert's "Worst Films of 1997" episode.

Accolades
The film, in spite of the poor reception, earned Ricci two award nominations; the first was a Kids Choice Award for "Favorite Movie Actress" and the second was a Young Artist Award - "Young Artist Award for Best Leading Young Actress in a Feature Film".

References

External links
 
 
 
 
 

1997 films
1997 comedy films
1990s buddy comedy films
1990s children's comedy films
1990s comedy mystery films
American buddy comedy films
American children's comedy films
American comedy mystery films
1997 directorial debut films
Disney film remakes
Films about the Federal Bureau of Investigation
Films about kidnapping
Films about animals
Films about cats
Films about missing people
Films based on American novels
Films based on children's books
Films scored by Richard Gibbs
Films set in Boston
Films set in Massachusetts
Films shot in Georgia (U.S. state)
Films shot in South Carolina
Films with screenplays by Scott Alexander and Larry Karaszewski
Films with screenplays by the Gordons
Walt Disney Pictures films
1990s English-language films
1990s American films